The Minkowski distance or Minkowski metric is a metric in a normed vector space which can be considered as a generalization of both the Euclidean distance and the Manhattan distance. It is named after the German mathematician Hermann Minkowski.

Definition 

The Minkowski distance of order  (where  is an integer) between two points

is defined as:

For  the Minkowski distance is a metric as a result of the Minkowski inequality. Since this violates the triangle inequality, for  it is not a metric. However, a metric can be obtained for these values by simply removing the exponent of  The resulting metric is also an F-norm.

Minkowski distance is typically used with  being 1 or 2, which correspond to the Manhattan distance and the Euclidean distance, respectively. In the limiting case of  reaching infinity, we obtain the Chebyshev distance:

Similarly, for  reaching negative infinity, we have:

The following figure shows unit circles (the level set of the distance function where all points are at the unit distance from the center) with various values of :

See also

External links 

 Simple IEEE 754 implementation in C++
 NPM JavaScript Package/Module

Normed spaces
Metric geometry
Hermann Minkowski
Distance